Jacob Gnahoui is a Beninese judoka who competes in the men's 60 kg category. At the 2012 Summer Olympics, he was defeated in the first round.

References

1985 births
Living people
Beninese male judoka
Olympic judoka of Benin
Judoka at the 2012 Summer Olympics